Sing All Love is the fourth full-length studio album by J-pop singer Minori Chihara.  It was released on February 17, 2010.

Track listing

2010 albums
Minori Chihara albums